Kikori is a small town in the Gulf Province of Papua New Guinea.

Kikori lies in the delta of the Kikori River at the head of the Gulf of Papua. This area is particularly biologically rich with a diversity of ecosystems and densely forested, with an intricate system of rivers. The geography is that of limestone karst country, with clay type soils. Oil exploitation in Kikori has been operating for several years. Its first commercial oil deposits were found there by the Kutubu Joint Venture (KJV) which has since constructed a pipeline to the Gulf of Papua and is actively extracting oil from the region.

It is the site of Kikori Airport.

Climate
Kikori has a tropical rainforest climate (Köppen Af) with very heavy rainfall year-round. Temperatures in Kikori are uniformly hot and humidity extremely uncomfortable.

Rainfall averages at least   during every month of the year, but orographic lifting of the southeast trade winds between May and September creates a rainfall peak in those months which average over  – twice as much as the least wet months of November and December and a striking contrast to the rainlessness of those same trade winds in relatively nearby Northern Australia.

See also
Mount Leonard Murray

Notes

References
Merriam Webster's Geographical Dictionary, Third Edition. Springfield, Massachusetts: Merriam-Webster, Incorporated, 1997. .

Populated places in Gulf Province
Gulf of Papua